Stenostegia is a monotypic genus of flowering plants belonging to the family Myrtaceae. The only species is Stenostegia congesta.

Its native range is Northern Australia.

References

Myrtaceae
Monotypic Myrtaceae genera
Endemic flora of Australia